Sustainable finance is the set of financial regulations, standards, norms and products that pursue an environmental objective. It allows the financial system to connect with the economy and its populations by financing its agents while maintaining a growth objective. The long-standing concept was promoted with the adoption of the Paris Climate Agreement, which stipulates that parties must make "finance flows consistent with a pathway towards low greenhouse gas emissions and climate-resilient development." In addition, sustainable finance had already a key role to play in the European Green Deal and in other EU International agreements, but since the COVID-19 pandemic its role is even more important.

In 2015, the United Nations adopted the 2030 Agenda to steer the transition towards a sustainable and inclusive economy. This commitment involves 193 member states and comprises 17 goals and 169 targets. SDGs aimed at tackling current global challenges, including protecting the planet. Sustainable finance has become a key cornerstone for the achievement of these goals.

Terminology
The terminology is essential to understand the different concepts around sustainable finance and the differences. As a matter of fact, the United Nations Environment Programme (UNEP) defines three concepts that are different but often used as synonyms, namely, climate, green and sustainable finance. First, climate finance is a subset of environmental finance, it mainly refers to funds which are addressing climate change adaptation and mitigation. Then, green finance has a broader scope because it also covers other environmental issues such as biodiversity protection. Lastly, sustainable finance includes Environmental, Social and Corporate Governance (ESG) factors in its scope. Sustainable finance extends its domain to the three components of ESG; it is therefore the broadest term, covering all financing activities that contribute to sustainable development.

International Initiative 
By signing the Paris Agreement, more than 190 countries have committed to fighting climate change and reducing environmental degradation. To reach the target of a maximum temperature increase of 2 °C, we need billions of green investments each year in key sectors of the global economy. Public finance will continue to play a key role, but a significant share of the funding will have to come from the private sector. Because financial markets are global, they offer a great opportunity, but this potential is largely untapped. Indeed, to mobilize international investors, it is necessary to promote integrated markets for environmentally sustainable finance at the global level. This requires a high degree of coherence between the different capital market frameworks and tools that are essential for investors to identify and seize green investment opportunities. This means working together to ensure the potential of financial markets, and it is in this context that the International Platform on Sustainable Finance has been created.

International Platform on Sustainable Finance (IPSF) 
The International Platform on Sustainable Finance (IPSF) was launched on 18 October 2019 by the European Union. The platform is a multi-stakeholder forum for dialogue between policymakers tasked with developing regulatory measures for sustainable finance to help investors identify and seize sustainable investment opportunities that truly contribute to climate and environmental goals.

The founding members of the IPSF are obviously the European Union, but also the competent authorities of Argentina, Canada, Chile, China, India, Kenya and Morocco. However, since its foundation, the Hong Kong Special Administrative Region of the People's Republic of China (HKSAR), Indonesia, Japan, Malaysia, New Zealand, Norway, Senegal, Singapore, Switzerland and the United Kingdom have also joined IPSF. Together, the 18 IPSF members represent 50% of the world's greenhouse gas emissions, 50% of the world's population and 45% of the world's GDP.

There are also seven Observers of the International Platform, namely, the European Central Bank, European Investment Bank, OECD, UNEP, NGFS, OICV-IOSCO and The Coalition of Finance Ministers for Climate Action. 
The ultimate objectives of the IPSF are to scale up the mobilization of private capital towards environmentally sustainable finance at the global level and to promote integrated markets for environmentally sustainable finance to increase the amount of private capital invested in environmentally sustainable investments by enabling members to exchange and disseminate information to promote best practice, benchmark their different initiatives and identify barriers and opportunities for sustainable finance while respecting national and regional contexts. Where appropriate, willing members can work to align their initiatives and approaches.

Sustainable Finance in Hong Kong 
 
Hong Kong’s Financial Secretary, Paul Chan, delivered the 2023-24 budget on 22 February 2023 with the promotion of a green economy, sustainable development and China’s “3060 Dual Carbon Targets” at the forefront.

Sustainable Finance and The European Union

European Green Deal

The European Green Deal is a proposal by the European Commission, approved in 2020,  to put in place a series of policies to make Europe climate neutral by 2050 and to cut at least half of its CO2 emissions by 2030. Within it, the Commission has promised to raise no less than €1 trillion in order to achieve the objectives of the European Green Deal by making sustainable investments. Part of this money has been raised to finance the Next Generation EU. Sustainable finance is therefore one of the pillars on which the EU Green Deal focuses and in addition to its own investments, the Commission would also like to promote private investments by introducing taxonomy regulation.

Next Generation EU

More recently, the European Commission, on behalf of its 27 member states, is also making greater use of green finance, especially green bond (see green bonds section) to finance part of NextGenerationEU. The aim of this initiative is to relaunch the economy following COVID-19 pandemic and aims to improve the European Union on several levels including; making it greener, accelerating its digitalisation, improving the health system and preparing it for future challenges or supporting young people and making Europe more inclusive. The main project under this initiative is the Recovery and Resilience Facility (RRF) which provides grants and loan funding to EU member states to support reform and investment. In order to access these funds, each EU Member State must propose a plan which must be approved by the European Commission and then by the Council. One of the most important criteria of this plan is that at least 37% is dedicated to the green aspect and 20% to digitalisation. Disbursement is gradual, with 13% received after the contract is signed, and the remainder on the basis of a bi-annual evaluation based on a report submitted and a payment request.

Tools and Standards

Green bonds 

In order to actually green finance or make it more sustainable, specific tools may be required and some have already been developed. The main one is the green bond. Green bonds are loans issued in the market by a public or private organization to finance environmentally friendly activities. Their issuance is growing steadily with an average growth of over 50% per year over the last five years. They reached $170 billion in 2018 and $523 billion in 2021. 
The aim of this type of bond (finance) is to encourage the financing of green projects by attracting investors and therefore reducing the cost of borrowing. According to empirical studies, the high demand for this type of bond provides it with a lower yield than its standard equivalent. Some scientific papers such as Gabor & al. (2019) strongly recommend including this climate factor in the risk assessment of bonds. The aim is, on the one hand, to increase the borrowing cost of brown bonds which can fund carbon-intensive projects and de-incentivise their investment by increasing the weight of climate risk. On the other hand, the goal is to reduce the weight of risk of green bonds in order to stimulate investment and potentially encourage banks to reduce the interest rate of these bonds.

From a legal point of view, green bonds are not really different from traditional bonds. The promises made to investors are not always included in the contract, and not often in a binding way. Issuers of green bonds usually follow standards and principles set by private-led organisations such as the International Capital Market Association (ICMA)'s Green Bond Principles or the label of the Climate bond initiative. The Paris agreement on climate change highlighted a desire to standardize reporting practices related to green bonds, in order to avoid greenwashing. To date, there are no regulations requiring the borrower to specify its "green" intentions in writing, however, the EU is currently developing a green bond standard which will force issuers to fund activities aligned with the EU taxonomy for sustainable activities. This standard is expected to be a voluntary standard, operating alongside other voluntary standards, with academics and practitioners raising the policymakers' awareness to the dangers of imposing it as a mandatory standard.

The European Union has already created its own "Next Generation EU Green bonds framework" to use green bonds to raise part of the funds for the Next Generation EU project. This project promises an investment of 750 billion euros in grants and loans (at 2018 prices), by the European Commission, aiming to revive the post-covid-19 economy in the 27 EU member states. Up to 30% of the budget will be raised by issuing green bonds, which results in up to 250 million, and a total of 14.5 million had already been raised by January 2022. This will make the European Commission the largest issuer of green bonds.

Empirical studies such as that conducted by Baldi and Pandimiglio (2022) show that the risk of greenwashing is present and may wrongly induce investors to accept lower rates of return than for brown investments. The standardization of this taxonomy would reduce the criticism of greenwashing that can be attributed to this type of obligation and enhance clarity and transparency in their use. Baldi and Pandimiglio (2022) further suggest that rating agencies focus more on this type of risk in order to identify and quantify it better.

Taxonomy of sustainable activities 

Because energy transition is a broad concept and sustainability or green can apply to many projects (renewable energy, energy efficiency, waste management, water management, public transportation, reforestation...), several taxonomies are being established to evaluate and certify "green" investments (having no or very little impact on the environment).

In 2018, the European Commission created a working group of technical experts on sustainable finance (TEG: Technical Expert Group) to define a classification of economic activities (the "taxonomy"), in order to have a robust methodology defining whether an activity or company is sustainable or not. The aim of the taxonomy is to prevent greenwashing and to help investors make greener choices. Investments are judged by six objectives: climate change mitigation, climate change adaptation, the circular economy, pollution, effect on water, and biodiversity.

The taxonomy came into force in July 2020. The taxonomy is seen as the most comprehensive and sophisticated initiative of its type; it may inspire other countries to develop their own taxonomies or may indeed become the world's 'gold standard. However, when the disclosure regime comes into effect in January 2022 there will still be huge gaps in data and it may be several years before it becomes effective.

The classifications of fossil gas and nuclear energy are controversial. The European Commission asked its Joint Research Centre to assess the environmental sustainability of nuclear. The results will be investigated for three months by two expert groups before the Commission makes a decision on the classification. Natural gas is seen by some countries as the bridge between coal and renewable energy, and those countries argue for natural gas to be considered sustainable under a set of conditions. In response, various members of the expert group that advises the European Commission threatened to step down. They stated they see the inclusion of gas as a contradiction to climate science, as methane emissions from the natural gas form are a significant greenhouse gas.

The UK is working on its own separate taxonomy.

Green-supporting factor on capital requirements 
To encourage banks to increase green lending, commercial banks have been proposing to introduce a "Green-supporting factor" on banks' capital requirements. This proposal is currently being considered by the European Commission and the European Banking Authority. However this approach is generally being opposed by central bankers and nonprofits organisations, which propose instead the adoption of higher capital requirements for assets linked with fossil fuels ("Brown-penalizing factor").

Mandatory and voluntary disclosure 

In addition, another tool and some standards lie in reporting and transparency. In 2015, the Financial Stability Board (FSB) launched the Taskforce on Climate-related Financial Disclosures (TCFD) which is led by Michael Bloomberg. The TCFD's recommendations aim to encourage companies to better disclose the climate-related risks in their business, as well as their internal governance enabling the management of these risks. In the United Kingdom, the Governor of the Bank of England, Mark Carney, has actively supported the TCFD's recommendations and has called on several occasions for the implementation of obligations for companies in the financial sector to be transparent and to take into account financial risks in their management, notably through climate stress tests.

In France, the 2015 Energy Transition Law requires institutional investors to be transparent about their integration of Environmental, Social and Governance Criteria into their investment strategy.

Nevertheless, empirical research has shown the limited effect of disclosure policies if they remain voluntary.

In addition, in October 2022, the Corporate Sustainability Reporting Directive was adopted. This new reporting rule will apply to all large firms, whether listed on stock markets or not. Therefore, around 50,000 companies will be covered by new rules, compared to about 11,700 with the former set of rules. More precisely, the impact of an organization on the environment, human rights and social standards will be introduced in this CSRD. Indeed, this reporting directive asks for more detailed reporting requirements thanks to common criteria, in line with the EU’s climate goals. The Commission will adopt the first set of standards by June 2023 after that, the aim of the Commission is to enlarge more and more companies to this set of standards. Indeed, from 1 January 2026, the rules will apply to listed SMEs and other undertakings, with reports due in 2027. However, SMEs can opt out until 2028. Thanks to this new set of rules, the EU has become a front-runner in global sustainability reporting standards.

Green Monetary Policy 
Policymakers, through their green monetary policies, help speed up the adoption of sustainable finance by supporting the development of investment instruments and fund structures tailored specifically to sustainable finance, creating incentives for investors, and establishing a regulatory agenda to standardize ESG measures of performance.

Green Central Banking 
The term "Green Central Banking" refers to the critical role that central banks must play in achieving zero-net-emissions targets and mitigating climate change. By adjusting their monetary policies into “green monetary policy” and capital requirements, central banks can redirect investment into green financing.

Network for Greening the Financial System (NGFS) 

In 2018, under the leadership of Mark Carney, Frank Elderson, and Banque de France Governor Villeroy de Galhau, eight central banks created the Network for Greening the Financial System (NGFS), a network of central banks and financial supervisors wanting to explore the potential role of central banks to accompany the energy transition. This network has nearly 116 central banks and supervisors and 19 observers including the International Monetary Fund (IMF) and the European Central Bank (ECB). Priorities for the NGFS include sharing best practices, advancing climate and environmental risk management in the financial sector, and mobilizing mainstream finance.

Several policy options for greening monetary policy instruments have been explored by the NGFS:

 Green refinancing operations: central banks can adopt green conditions when banks refinance themselves from central banks, for example by granting a lower interest rate if banks issue a certain volume of loans for green projects.
 Green collateral frameworks: central banks can restrict collateral eligibility rules by excluding polluting assets, or requiring banks to mobilize a pool of assets that is aligned with net zero trajectories.
 Green quantitative easing: central banks could restrict their asset purchases programmes to green bonds.

The NGFS, through its working group “Workstream 2”, has published new Scenarios for central banks and supervisors in September 2022 in partnership with an academic consortium. The NGFS Scenarios were developed to assess the impact of climate change on the global economy and financial markets. While developed primarily for use by central banks and supervisors, they may be valuable to the broader business sector, government, and academics as well.

European Central Bank’s Financial Commitment to Addressing Climate Change 
During the United Nations Climate Change Conference (COP 26), in July 2021, under the leadership of Christine Lagarde and after pressure from NGOs, the ECB committed to contributing to the implementation of the Paris Agreement's aim of “making finance flows consistent with a pathway towards low greenhouse gas emissions and climate-resilient development”. (Article 2.1. (c) of the Paris Agreement, 2015)  The ECB also announced a detailed roadmap to incorporate climate change in its monetary policy framework. The action plan includes measures to integrate climate-risks metrics in the ECB's collateral framework and corporate sector purchase programme (CSPP) referred to bonds. Christine Lagarde said she was also in favour of developing "green lending facilities" like the Bank of Japan and People's Bank of China.

Action Plan of the ECB on Climate Change 
In accordance with its recent decisions, the ECB commits to contributing to the Paris Agreement goals and NGFS initiatives within its mandate by taking the following specific actions:
 Integrating climate-related risks into financial stability monitoring and prudential supervision of bank
 Integrating sustainability factors into own portfolio management
 Exploring the effects of climate-related risks on the Eurosystem monetary policy framework within our mandate
 Bridging data gaps in climate-related data
 Working towards higher awareness and intellectual capacity, also through technical assistance and knowledge sharing

Debate 
There are a few concerns and limitations that can be attributed to sustainable finance.

The important number of standards 
First, as already seen, the concept of sustainable finance is directly linked with ESG. However, there are still no universally adopted standards for how companies and organisations can measure and report on their sustainability performance. Instead, we have a large number of NGOs working independently to develop standards for sustainability reporting, which is creating complexity and confusion for companies and investors.  Indeed, the initiators of reforms in sustainable finance can be very different. There are initiatives from non-governmental organisations such as Global Reporting Initiative (GRI), IFRS Foundation, the International Integrated Reporting Council (IIRC) and the Carbon Disclosure Project. However, recently, it seems like the IFRS Foundation is taking the lead. This is possible because the organisation possess a deep expertise in the standard-setting process, it also have a legitimacy in the corporate and investor community, and regulators support it internationally.

Then, since sustainable finance is rather new and above all, a constantly evolving topic with an important number of actors, it is impossible to find a constant framework overtime. For example, a new framework for sustainable finance, ISO 32210 was published in October 2022. This tool provides guidance to all organisations, active in the financial sector, including, but not limited to, direct lenders and investors, asset managers and service providers, on the implementation of sustainability principles, practices and terminology for financing activities.

Because of this pool of standards and the constant evolution, it is not unusual hat some funds or companies are not as green as they claim to be. Indeed, some ESG funds still hold shares in oil and coal companies. However, since there are no universally adopted standards, this practice is still ongoing.

Lastly, it is important to mention that the focus here was almost exclusively on the European Union, at an international level, the lack of homogeneity on sustainable finance norms and standards is even larger. However, initiatives such as the International Platform on Sustainable Finance open the discussion and the exchange of best practices to have more international norms and standards.

Lack of comparability 
In addition, the same actors also face a lack of comparability. Indeed, it is very difficult to compare companies and investments on the basis of their ESG performance. Taking again the example of the oil and gas industry, the reporting on sustainability is carried in varied ways. Indeed, according to a study conducted by researchers at the University of Perugia's Economics Department, out of 51 relevant GRI indicators, only four indicators appear in over 75% of the companies' GRI reports. In addition, it is even difficult, sometimes, to compare the performance of the same company or fund overtime. From one year to the next, due to changes in methodology, companies consulted, or decisions related to the use of different standards to measure the same thing, comparing the performance can be nearly impossible.

Green Central Banking legitimacy 
Another concern worth debating in sustainable finance is the legitimacy of Green Central Banking.

First, in response to the recent global financial crisis, which started with the outbreak of the pandemic, there has been a strong reliance on central banks to intervene not only for their traditional prudential motives of ensuring price and financial stability but also for more promotional purposes as a means of supporting other policy objectives such as promoting a low-carbon economy (Baer et al. 2021). However, according to many researchers, the pursuit of such promotional goals in monetary policy decisions raises serious questions about the legitimacy of independent central banks (Fontan et al. 2016). By way of illustration, Greenpeace protestors claimed in March 2021 that the European Central Bank's (ECB) monetary policies subsidise fossil fuel companies (Treeck, 2021).

Furthermore, the Central Bank Independence (CBI) framework says that central banks should be permitted to operate independently within a limited mandate (Dietsch et al., 2018), although other writers feel that changing the central bank's mandate is insufficient (Fontan et al. 2022).

Central banks are rarely tasked with advancing environmental or climate change mitigation objectives. When it comes to these environmental policies, central banks must deal with arbitrary issues, and there is no agreement on who should bear the burden. Neither conservative nor progressive central bankers defend this dilemma (Fontan et al. 2022). As a result, according to the previous authors, their pursuit of green monetary policies puts central banks in a tough spot, casting doubt on their legitimacy.

In a nutshell, Baer and co-authors argue that central banks may their legitimacy issues by working in tandem with elected officials. In other words, a thorough examination of the actions of central banks necessitates a close examination of the actions of the governments and parliaments that formulate the central bank's mandate (Elgie 2002). Whether it's through working with a green investment bank to reduce their carbon footprint or forming joint committees of central bankers and members of parliament to influence the types of assets they purchase (Fontan et al. 2022).

References 

Sustainable business
Ethical investment
Ethical banking
Corporate social responsibility
Social finance
Economy and the environment
Sustainability